WUCT (1600 AM, "NewsTalk 94.1") is a radio station licensed to Algood, Tennessee, United States, the station serves the Cookeville area. The station is currently owned by Jwc Broadcasting.

History
The station went on the air as WRZK on June 22, 1981. On June 1, 1983, the station changed its call sign to WWRT, and on January 15, 1990 to WATX. WATX originally broadcast on 1590 kilohertz, and later moved to 1600. The station subsequently added a translator on 100.9 FM, known as W265BC (WATX-FM unofficially).

In January 2017, WATX rebranded as "NewsTalk 94.1" (switching translators to W231DG 94.1 FM Cookeville). On January 1, 2017, WATX changed call letters to WUCT.

References

External links

UCT
News and talk radio stations in the United States
Radio stations established in 1981
1981 establishments in Tennessee